Khamiscar is a genus of spiders in the family Oonopidae. It was first described in 2015 by Platnick & Berniker. , it contains 6 species, all found in Madagascar.

Species
Khamiscar comprises the following species:
Khamiscar ambi Platnick & Berniker, 2015
Khamiscar anta Platnick & Berniker, 2015
Khamiscar baly Platnick & Berniker, 2015
Khamiscar kiri Platnick & Berniker, 2015
Khamiscar maro Platnick & Berniker, 2015
Khamiscar tola Platnick & Berniker, 2015

References

Oonopidae
Araneomorphae genera
Spiders of Madagascar